Idesia as established by Scopoli is a suppressed name; see Diospyros.

Idesia is a genus of flowering plants in the family Salicaceae (formerly placed in the family Flacourtiaceae), comprising the single species Idesia polycarpa. It is native to eastern Asia in China, Japan, Korea, and Taiwan.

It is a medium-sized deciduous tree reaching a height of 8–21 m, with a trunk up to 50 cm diameter with smooth greyish-green bark. The shoots are greyish-brown, stout, with a thick pith core. The leaves are large, heart-shaped, 8–20 cm long and 7–20 cm broad, with a red 4–30 cm petiole bearing two or more glands; the leaves are dark green above, glaucous below, and have a coarsely serrated margin. The flowers are small, yellowish green, fragrant, and born in panicles 13–30 cm long. It is dioecious with male and female flowers on separate trees; the male flowers are 12–16 mm diameter, the female flowers 9 mm diameter. The fruit is a berry 5–10 mm diameter, ripening orange to dark purple-red, containing several 2–3 mm brown seeds, and often persisting until the following spring.

Cultivation and uses
The fruit is edible either raw or cooked.

The species is occasionally grown as an ornamental tree in other temperate regions including Europe.

References

Salicaceae
Trees of China
Trees of Japan
Trees of Korea
Trees of Taiwan
Dioecious plants
Monotypic Malpighiales genera
Salicaceae genera